The Saccharomycetaceae are a family of yeasts in the order Saccharomycetales that reproduce by budding. Species in the family have a cosmopolitan distribution, and are present in a wide variety of habitats, especially those with a plentiful supply of carbohydrate sources. The family contains the species Saccharomyces cerevisiae, perhaps the most economically important fungus.

Genera
According to the 2007 Outline of Ascomycota, 20 genera are within the family, although for several of these (marked with a question mark below), the placement is uncertain and requires more study.

Brettanomyces
Candida
?Citeromyces
?Cyniclomyces
?Debaryomyces
?Issatchenkia
Kazachstania (synonymous with Arxiozyma)
Kluyveromyces
Komagataella
Kuraishia
Lachancea
?Lodderomyces
Nakaseomyces
?Pachysolen
Pichia
Saccharomyces
Spathaspora
Tetrapisispora
Vanderwaltozyma
Torulaspora
?Williopsis
Zygosaccharomyces
Zygotorulaspora

Species Fungorum also has Schwanniomyces in the family.

References

 
Yeasts
Ascomycota families